Guangjiao Temple is a Buddhist temple located in Xuanzhou District, Xuancheng, Anhui, China. Alongside Huacheng Temple, Cuifeng Temple and Kaihua Temple, it is honoured as the "Four Famous Buddhist Temples in Anhui". It was first built in the Tang dynasty by a prominent Chan master Huangbo Xiyun, and went through many changes and repairs through the following dynasties. Most of the present structures in the temple were repaired or rebuilt between 2004 and 2006.

History
The temple was built by an accomplished Chan master Huangbo Xiyun in 849 in the region of Emperor Xuanzong of the Tang dynasty (618–907).

In the reign of Emperor Taizong (976–997) of the Song dynasty (960–1279), the emperor gave a set of Buddhist sutras to the temple. Mei Yaochen and Su Shi paid religious homage to the temple.

In the Kangxi period (1662–1722) of the Qing dynasty (1644–1911), Shitao resided in Guangjiao Temple, where he preached Buddhism and drew paintings.

In 1937, after the Marco Polo Bridge Incident, the Second Sino-Japanese War broke out, Guangjiao Temple was completely destroyed in the war with only the Twin Pagodas remaining.

Reconstruction of Guangjiao Temple commenced in 2004 and was completed in 2006.

Architecture
The extant buildings include the Shanmen, Four Heavenly Kings Hall, Mahavira Hall, Hall of Ksitigarbha, Drum tower, Bell tower, Buddhist Texts Library and two pagodas.

Twin Pagodas
The Twin Pagodas was first built in 1096 under the Song dynasty and underwent two renovations, respectively in 1989 and 2014. In 1956, the Twin Pagodas were inscribed as provincial key cultural units by the Anhui Provincial Government. In January 1988, the Twin Pagodas was listed among the third batch of "Major National Historical and Cultural Sites in Anhui" by the State Council of China.

References

Buddhist temples in Anhui
Buildings and structures in Xuancheng
Tourist attractions in Xuancheng
2006 establishments in China
21st-century Buddhist temples
Religious buildings and structures completed in 2006